The Niagara Falls Suspension Bridge stood from 1855 to 1897 across the Niagara River and was the world's first working railway suspension bridge. Trains used the upper of its two decks, while pedestrians and carriages used the lower. The bridge was the idea of Canadian politicians, and it was built by an American company and a Canadian company. It was most commonly called the Suspension Bridge, although other names included Niagara Railway Suspension Bridge, Niagara Suspension Bridge, and its official American name of the International Suspension Bridge.

The bridge was part of Canadian politician William Hamilton Merritt's vision to promote trade within his country and with its neighbor the United States.  Many argued that a suspension bridge could not support the safe passage of trains, including bridge builders.  Nonetheless, the bridge companies hired Charles Ellet, Jr., who laid a line by a kite across the  chasm and built a temporary suspension bridge in 1848.  Ellet left the project after a financial dispute with the bridge companies, who hired John Augustus Roebling to complete the project.  By 1854, his bridge was nearly complete, and the lower deck was opened for pedestrian and carriage travel.  On March 18, 1855, a fully laden passenger train officially opened the completed bridge.

The Suspension Bridge was a border crossing between Canada and the United States, and it played significant roles in the histories of the Niagara region and the two countries.  Three railway lines crossed over the bridge, connecting cities on both sides of the border.  The Great Western Railway, New York Central Railroad, and New York and Erie Rail Road differed in track gauge; the bridge used a triple gauge system to conserve space, overlapping two tracks on top of each other and using a rail of each to form the third track. The railroads brought a large influx of trade and tourists into the region around the Niagara Falls. In the time leading to the American Civil War, the Underground Railroad helped slaves in the United States escape across the Suspension Bridge to freedom in Canada. After the war, the bridge became a symbol of inspiration to Americans, encouraging them to rebuild their country and pushing them to quickly industrialize their nation.

The bridge's success proved that a railway suspension bridge could be safe and operational. Its wooden structures began to decay and were replaced with stronger steel and iron versions by 1886. Heavier trains required it to be replaced by the Steel Arch Bridge, later renamed the Whirlpool Rapids Bridge, on August 27, 1897.

Conception and construction 
In the mid-19th century, the hinterlands of the North American East Coast opened up rapidly. In Canada, entrepreneur and politician William Hamilton Merritt helped establish several trade routes, especially in dredged waterways between the lake cities. He also envisioned a U.S. and Canadian rail network to connect the Atlantic coast with new territories in the West, and this led to a railway suspension bridge across the Niagara River below the falls.

Merritt's vision for the Niagara Suspension Bridge was conceived at the Niagara River itself. In summer 1844 while taking a picnic on the river shores, near what was then the town of Clifton, Merritt read a letter from his sons to his wife. The younger Merritts were touring Europe and visited the town of Fribourg, Switzerland. Amazed by the Freiburg Suspension Bridge, they wrote to their parents, describing the wonders of the bridge in eloquent terms.  Their writing had a profound effect on their parents, and the elder Merritts wondered if such a suspension bridge could be built across the Niagara. Merritt was driven to realize that vision, and he approached the relevant authorities, including Queen Victoria, for permission to start the construction of the suspension bridge.  His efforts were rewarded in 1846; the state of New York and the government of Canada West approved the charters to form the Niagara Falls International Bridge Company and the Niagara Falls Suspension Bridge Company, respectively.

In the years before the first bridge was built over the Niagara River, the river was crossed entirely by boats. Powered by steam engines, vessels ferried people and carriages across the raging river at calmer points of the water. One of these vessels was the Maid of the Mist, the first tourist boat to ply the waters of the Niagara River. Named after a local legend, the steamer began service in 1846. The site for the Suspension Bridge was half a mile (0.8 km) from the Maid of the Mists landings.

After the bridge companies were founded, they invited engineers to submit plans and cost estimates for a suspension bridge that carried a railway.  The invitation was met with skepticism among the engineering community. At that time, there was not a suspension bridge that could allow a train to pass over it safely. While the Europeans were erecting suspension bridges by the hundreds, the Americans mostly ignored them out of safety concerns; in 1831 Sir Samuel Brown's Broughton Suspension Bridge in Britain had collapsed under the marching feet of a troop of soldiers, sending those on its deck into the River Irwell.  Furthermore, many American bridges had collapsed without experiencing weight and pressure equivalent to railroad traffic, and American engineers feared that any railway bridge would likely fail—especially a suspension bridge.

Four engineers responded: Edward Serrell, Samuel Keefer, Charles Ellet, Jr., and John Augustus Roebling. All submitted designs for a suspension bridge. At the time of the bidding, Ellet and Roebling were acknowledged as masters of suspension bridge building in America. Roebling submitted two designs, a conservative single-deck suspension bridge and a double-decked version, both with meticulous calculations and drawings. Instead of relying solely on submissions, Charles Ellet, Jr. took a proactive approach. When he got wind of the project in 1845, he wrote to Charles B. Stuart, chief engineer of the Great Western Railway, boldly proclaiming that he could build a bridge for any likely purpose across the Niagara. After the charters had been obtained, Ellet helped Stuart to sell the bridge companies' stock and offered to buy US$30,000 worth of stock himself. His efforts earned him the $190,000 bridge contract on November 9, 1847.

Charles Ellet Jr.'s temporary bridge 

While growing up on a farm in Pennsylvania, Charles Ellet Jr. scraped through odd jobs, but saved enough money to finance an education at the École nationale des Ponts et Chaussées in France. After attending four months of lectures, he toured Europe before returning to the United States as the only native-born American with European education in engineering. Ellet announced his ambitions to build suspension bridges in his country of birth by proposing to span the Potomac River with one. His proposal was ignored; few were willing to heed a young, inexperienced and impetuous engineer. To gain experience, Ellet started to work on railroads and canals, and later became the chief engineer on the James River and Kanawha Canal project. He further improved his reputation by contributing articles about suspension bridges to respected engineering journals, such as American Railroad Journal; eventually, Ellet built his first suspension bridge over the Schuylkill River, Pennsylvania, in 1842.

Ellet had the looks of an actor, which were complemented by his entertaining oratorical skills. He took advantage of these characteristics, and used showmanship and dramatics to market his proposals. These skills helped to win him attention and raise his profile both in the public and within the industry.  However, his imperiousness also ruffled the feathers of people, which caused conflicts. Nonetheless, his capability to promote himself had won him the contracts for the Suspension Bridge and the later Wheeling Suspension Bridge; the Wheeling contract was won in July 1847, while Ellet's plan for the Niagara Suspension Bridge was still in its initial stages of construction. Ellet's initial design for the bridge at Niagara placed all forms of transportation on a single deck. The railway track was in the middle of the deck, sandwiched between carriageways and footpaths on the outer sides. Moreover, trains would not go over the bridge; their cars would be disconnected from the heavy locomotives and pulled across the bridge by horses, cables, or lighter  engines. Before the work could begin, Ellet faced the problem of all suspension bridge construction: getting a line across the gap.

Ellet's brainstorming sessions with his men raised several ideas that could enable a line to be suspended across the gorge; these included firing cannonballs with the line attached, towing it across the river with a steamer, and tying it to a rocket that would then be launched across the gorge. Ultimately the bridge engineer chose an idea inspired by Benjamin Franklin's experiment with a kite. It was similar to 15th century inventor Leonardo da Vinci's plan to span a gap. Ellet also took the opportunity to generate publicity for his project. Organizing a kite-flying contest, he offered $5 to any boy who flew a kite across the gorge and secured the kite string to the other side. Youths from nearby towns flocked in to participate in contest that was held in January 1848. Unlike the other boys who flew their kites from the United States side of the gorge, 16-year-old Homan Walsh crossed the river by a ferry upstream and walked to the Canadian side of the bridge site to launch his kite. He almost succeeded on his first attempt; his kite flew across but crashed just short of the shore. After resting several days at a friend's house, Walsh finally got his kite across the gorge and secured its line to a tree.

Charles Ellet and his team tied a heavier line to the kite string and pulled the joined lines across. They pulled successive heavier and stronger lines across until the final bridge cable— thick—was hanging across the gorge. Ellet planned to use this system as a basket ferry to shuttle workers and materials across the gorge, saving time that would otherwise have been spent on land and ferry travel. Through media coverage and word-of-mouth, many people knew of Ellet's efforts and flocked to the site to watch the construction. On March 13, 1848, the system was completed, and the team planned to test it by pulling the empty basket across. They hit a snag when the basket kept getting stuck halfway and could not move ahead. Pulling back the basket, Ellet decided to assure the watching crowd that the system was workable. He stepped into the basket, and it moved towards the opposite shore. When Ellet reached the problematic spot, he spotted the issue; the basket's rollers could not pass over a portion of the cable that had been accidentally flattened during the construction. He fixed the problem and proceeded to cross to the Canadian side and back, becoming the first person to cross the gorge. Although the bridge companies had prohibited Ellet from collecting tolls, he charged each person $1.00 for the chance to "observe first hand the engineering wonder of bridging the Niagara." On some days, the basket ferry conveyed up to 125 people across the gorge.

He intended to use this temporary bridge as a scaffold for the construction of the permanent railway bridge. On July 29, 1848, the bridge builder inaugurated the span in his typical manner; standing in his horse-buggy like a gladiator in his chariot, Ellet sped across the bridge, which had railings for only a third of its length at that time. His stunt garnered further publicity for the bridge, and the toll collected from the span proved lucrative; $5,000 was collected in less than a year since its official opening on August 1, 1848. Disputes arose between the bridge companies and Ellet over their shares of the money, and their relations turned bitter. The companies charged that Ellet was late in his schedule and withheld payment. Ellet retaliated by mounting cannons at the bridge to claim ownership over it. In the end the matter went to court. The bridge companies paid $10,000 to Charles Ellet, and he left the project to work full-time on the Wheeling Suspension Bridge.

The Niagara Suspension Bridge project was in hiatus for three years before the bridge companies engaged another renowned civil engineer, John Augustus Roebling, to complete it. The delay caused Roebling to miss out on the honor of building the first permanent bridge to span the Niagara; Serrell completed the Lewiston Suspension Bridge in 1851. Roebling would, however, achieve other honors in building his Niagara Railway Suspension Bridge.

John Augustus Roebling's railway bridge 

Born in Prussia (later a part of Germany), John Augustus Roebling obtained his first conditional engineering degree (Feldmesserprüfung) at Erfurt in 1824.  He attended two semesters of lessons at Berlin's Bauakademie and worked for the Prussian government, constructing military roads. Tired of the bureaucracy, he resigned his position and left for the United States in 1830, arriving with his brother in Philadelphia on August 6, 1831. Instead of continuing an engineering profession, he took up farming for a living. After five years he married a tailor's daughter, and had eight children with her over the next decade. He found agrarian work unsatisfactory, and in 1837, after the death of his brother and the birth of his first child, he returned to engineering.

Roebling first signed on as a surveyor for the Beaver River canal system, launching his career with a string of canal and railroad projects. Aside from writing articles in engineering journals, Roebling designed his own wire cables and started his own company to manufacture them; the John A. Roebling Company was the first wire rope manufacturer in the United States. Gradually gaining fame for his civil engineering, Roebling finally got to build suspension bridges. His first bridge was the Allegheny Suspension Aqueduct in Pittsburgh. The structure, completed in 1845, was the first suspension aqueduct in the world and the first large American suspension bridge that had multiple spans. Furthermore, it was the first suspension structure built with modern cable-spinning techniques—Roebling's own invention. Earlier bridge building techniques involved fabricating the main cables at a factory, transporting them to the bridge site, and then stretching the heavy cables over the gap to erect them over the bridge. Roebling, during his experiments with wire ropes, conceived and patented a new construction method for these main cables. A long line—the traveler rope—formed a loop around two horizontal wheels, one on each side of the gorge. A lightweight wheel, "the traveling wheel," was attached to this line, and a wire threaded around this wheel. Like a belt in a mechanical system, the traveler rope and its wheel moved across the gap as the horizontal wheels turned, pulling the wire along. The traveling wheel effectively hauled two lengths of the same wire (running above and under the traveling wheel) across the gap at a time. The lengths of wire were collected and bound at intervals to form thicker strands, which were later compressed together into the main cables, supporting themselves and later the proportional weight of the bridge as they were formed. The method became the standard for suspension bridge construction, and remained unchanged for many years. In the 20th century, suspension bridges were still built with this pulley winding system, albeit with more sophisticated equipment.

Roebling was a contrasting character to Charles Ellet. Whereas Ellet embellished his proposals with fanciful words and deeds, Roebling presented papers filled with meticulous calculations and drawings. The elder engineer was stern and driven to achieve, taking a scientific approach to all interests. Rarely did he show emotions in his dealings, even to his closest associates. However, he dared to confront his detractors and make bold exaltations about his work. He openly called European suspension bridges—including American suspension bridges built with European techniques—weak, and occasionally sniped at Ellet's and Stephenson's works. He announced that his Brooklyn Bridge, when completed, "will not only be the greatest bridge in existence, but it will be the greatest engineering work of this continent, and of the age." Roebling's history with Ellet started before the bidding for the Niagara Suspension Bridge, early in their careers. During the bidding for the Schuylkill Suspension Bridge project, Ellet had written a proposal that was published in the American Railroad Journal.  Mistakenly believing Ellet had won the contract, Roebling wrote to offer his congratulations and requested to be Ellet's assistant. He received a formal reply without any reference to his request, and his subsequent letter was ignored. When Roebling learned that a contractor had won the bid, he successfully applied to be the contractor's chief engineer. Ellet, however, persisted with his tactics and snatched the project away from the contractor; he promoted himself to the bridge company and offered to accept land instead of cash as payment. From then on, Ellet and Roebling became rivals, vying with each other for suspension bridge projects in North America. Roebling learned from their rivalry. His losses to Ellet showed him that he needed to promote himself and gain backers to effectively secure the contracts he desired.

When Roebling was called to the Niagara Suspension Bridge project in 1851, he had six suspension structures to his name. He found Ellet's final plan to be impractical; the bridge would have been too heavy and expensive. Roebling had another design in mind: the double-deck bridge he had proposed earlier during the bidding. Roebling reasoned that the decks and sufficient trusses would form a rigid tube, making the bridge stiffer than a normal suspension bridge. The theory was similar to that of the tubular bridge but implemented at a lower cost. The engineering community was critical of Roebling's project. Robert Stephenson, builder of the tubular Britannia Bridge, was among those shortlisted to complete the Niagara Suspension Bridge before Roebling's selection. Stephenson had submitted a design for a tubular bridge, and in 1859 he built a large and expensive tubular bridge for the Grand Trunk Railway at Montreal, Quebec. The bridge builder then said in derision of Roebling's suspension railway, "If your bridge succeeds, mine is a magnificent blunder."

In the face of criticism, Roebling completed the project in four years, using Ellet's bridge as scaffolding. Ten days later the upper deck of the bridge was officially opened; the lower deck had been opened to the public a year earlier. As the first commercial passenger train trundled over the bridge, the two countries were finally connected by railroad across the Niagara River. The successful crossings of these and later trains made Roebling's Suspension Bridge the first working suspension railway bridge in history.

Engineering 

Roebling's bridge was supported by two limestone towers on each side of the gorge. With their foundations  in the earth, the limestone structures could support up to 12 million pounds (5.4 million kg). Each cable comprised 3,059 wires that were spun with Roebling's patented technique used in his Allegheny Suspension Aqueduct. Support lines hung down from iron clamps that encircled the main cables, and held up the decks. Deep trusses—never before seen on a large suspension bridge—lined the sides of the bridge,  and joined the two decks so that the structure looked like a cage. The trussed sides and the upper and lower decks, which spanned , formed a "hollow straight beam," reinforcing the rigidity of the bridge.

The Suspension Bridge was further stiffened by guy-wires which ran from its upper deck to the top of its towers. Criticism of suspension bridges was growing after the Wheeling Suspension Bridge collapsed under strong winds in 1854. To address these concerns, Roebling added more guy-wires to secure the lower deck to the shores below. Roebling's efforts ensured that his Suspension Bridge remained standing while other suspension bridges across the Niagara River collapsed because of strong winds. Although he was not the first engineer to appreciate the need for a suspension bridge to be sufficiently rigid or to implement the methods to do so, Roebling was the first to understand the principles behind the methods and combine them in the building of a suspension bridge. Roebling proved that despite popular opinion, properly built suspension bridges can safely support the passage of heavy railway traffic. His combination of stiffening methods created the first modern suspension bridge. Such was the rigidity of the Suspension Bridge that it withstood the shockwave caused by the nearby fall of a  mass of rock in 1863; the force of the impact manifested itself as a wave, rippling through the decks of the bridge from the American side to the Canadian side and back.

From the United States, the New York and Erie Rail Road's Canandaigua and Niagara Falls Railroad and New York Central Railroad's Buffalo and Niagara Falls Railroad crossed over the bridge and reached into Ontario. Similarly, the Great Western Railway in Canada extended its network from Canada into New York. Instead of accommodating three railways side-by-side on a single wide deck, the bridge saved space by overlapping the tracks over each other. This method used only four rails; one pair formed the track for one railway, and the other pair formed another. One rail from each pair would then form the final track. In the first year of the bridge's operation, an average of 30 trains trundled across it each day. Five years later, 45 trains passed over the structure daily.

He was confident the bridge could handle faster train traffic, but he preferred a safe operation. In his tests the bridge supported a  train, bending  under the weight. This was within the maximum load of  specified in the design of the bridge. The figure was a conservative estimate. The cables and guy-wires could support , and travel journalist Alfred J. Pairpoint commented that it was normal to see  trains pass over the bridge without danger. The bridge shook whenever a train trundled over it, although this had no effect on its integrity. When the frequency of passing trains was high, the trembling was noticeable to travelers on the lower deck and proved uncomfortable to some; writer Mark Twain noted, "You drive over to Suspension Bridge and divide your misery between the chances of smashing down two hundred feet into the river below, and the chances of having a railway-train overhead smashing down onto you. Either possibility is discomforting taken by itself, but, mixed together, they amount in the aggregate to positive unhappiness." Despite such commentaries, thousands of people crossed over the bridge safely every day.

American engineers regard the Suspension Bridge as a major achievement of efficiency. In a fledgling country where resources—material and financial—were limited, they had to make do with whatever was available. This goal was espoused by the American Society of Civil Engineers, which opined, "That is the best engineering, not which makes the most splendid, or even the most perfect work, but that which makes a work that answers the purpose well, at the least cost."  Roebling had built a bridge that rivaled grander bridges of leading European nations at a much lower cost. His Suspension Bridge used only one-sixth the material of Stephenson's Brittania Bridge, but was twice as long and had a capacity that exceeded the tubular bridge. Moreover, the expenditure on Roebling's Suspension Bridge was $400,000, whereas a tubular bridge of equivalent length and load-bearing capability would have cost $4 million. Roebling's success established him as the master of suspension bridges. The inclined guy-wires that stretched from the top of towers to the roadway of the Suspension Bridge became the signature of his future works.

Although the Suspension Bridge proved that the suspension system could be safely used to carry railroads, no more suspension railway bridges were built. The outbreak of the American Civil War diverted attention from such civil engineering ventures, and by the time attention was paid to building bridges again, cantilever bridges were in vogue for railway bridges. Regardless, the Suspension Bridge's success made it a model for suspension railway bridges. When the city of Quebec called for a structure to span the St. Lawrence River in 1850, it looked to the Suspension Bridge for inspiration. Seventeen years later, the British journal Engineering called for a suspension railway to bridge the Straits of Messina and also referred to Roebling's bridge. Lastly, Charles B. Stuart opened his 1871 work on the history of American engineering, Lives and Works of Civil and Military Engineering in America, with an illustration of the bridge.

Legacy 
As a border crossing between two large growing countries, the Suspension Bridge had throngs of travelers passing over it. Furthermore, it was the intersection of three major railroads. Coupled with its vicinity to a natural wonder, the Niagara Falls, the bridge brought a lot of railroad traffic into the region once it was opened. The towns at the ends of the bridge benefited greatly from this heavy movement of people and goods. The village of Suspension Bridge, United States, grew quickly within a few years after the opening of the bridge, acquiring shops, factories, and a hotel. Its tourism and commerce soon rivaled the town of Niagara Falls, New York; eventually, the village was merged into the town in 1892. Similarly, Clifton on the Canadian end of the bridge was integrated into the town of Niagara Falls, Ontario. The two Niagara Falls cities boasted commerce that surpassed neighboring settlements. Around the time of its official opening, the bridge was one of the busiest points of trade on the United States-Canada border, carrying $12 million of transitory goods and $2 million of bonded materials into Canada. To handle the large amount of goods exchanged over the border, the Lewiston customs house—the primary customs for the Niagara region—was relocated to the Niagara Suspension Bridge in 1863.

The bridge's depiction as an engineering marvel and beautiful sight lured many visitors to the Falls. Travelers could, while crossing the bridge, enjoy a view of the Falls enhanced by the sensation of standing  in the air. The Falls, however, proved distant and indistinct to some when there was overcast weather. On the whole, the Suspension Bridge was considered as an attraction that must be seen by visitors to Niagara Falls. In paintings and prints of the bridge, the Suspension Bridge became the focus, pushing the Falls into the background. Unlike paintings of the Falls that capture the viewer's eye with their majestic views of the natural wonder, pictures of the bridge impressed viewers with the utilitarian design of the structure. By 1897, the inbound trains to Niagara Falls brought 276,900 visitors during the months of May to August. A streetcar system was established in 1882 to handle the increasing cross-border pedestrian traffic. Initially pulled by horses, the trolleys were converted to run on electricity in 1892. The Suspension Bridge was the pride and symbol of the Great Western Railway, which touted it as the "only Route via Niagara Falls & Suspension Bridge."

Travelers on the Suspension Bridge witnessed several death-defying stunts performed across the Niagara Gorge. On June 30, 1859, they saw Charles Blondin's feat of becoming the first man to cross the chasm on a tightrope. In mid-crossing Blondin sat down on the rope and lowered a line to retrieve a drink from the deck of the Maid of the Mist below. In his later tightrope acts at the same spot, the acrobat would perform a different stunt on each occasion. One time he cooked and ate an omelette in mid-crossing; another time he carried his manager Harry Colcord on his back. While giving Colcord a piggyback ride, Blondin stopped five times on the tightrope to rest and recover his strength; each time Colcord gingerly got off Blondin's back and stood on the tightrope, climbing back on after the acrobat had enough rest. Blondin's success inspired other acrobats, such as William Leonard Hunt ("The Great Farini"), Samuel Dixon, Clifford Calverly, and Signorina Maria Spelterini, to emulate and try to surpass his acts at the same spot.  The Signorina, the only woman to walk across the Niagara on a tightrope, once crossed while blindfolded and another time with her hands and legs in manacles.

Another group of people in America had their own risky crossings over the Niagara Gorge as they fled over the border into Canada. They were enslaved African-Americans who sought freedom by escaping to a country that declared the liberation of any slave who entered it. The bridge was part of the Underground Railroad, a network of routes designed to smuggle slaves in the United States to freedom in Canada. Before the American Civil War, fleeing slaves had only four main routes into Canada, of which one was crossing the Niagara River. Enslaved people who escaped along the Niagara route had help from several quarters.  The state of New York generally favored granting freedom to enslaved people; this attitude emboldened African-American workers in Niagara, who frequently helped slaves flee to Canada. Before the Suspension Bridge was completed, fugitives either crossed the raging river on a boat or risked their lives by swimming at calmer points of the river. The Suspension Bridge made escape across the river easier and safer, although there was still risk. To avoid getting caught and sent back to their owners, enslaved people had to sneak across on foot or hide aboard trains and oxcarts. Antislavery activist Harriet Tubman guided fugitives at night and bribed custom officials to turn a blind eye. As a result, many slaves crossed the Suspension Bridge to freedom before the United States was engulfed in civil war.

When the American Civil War ended and the United States turned its focus toward rebuilding, Roebling started building his Brooklyn Bridge. As the monumental task could affect naval navigation, it required state approval, and the government wanted a thorough review of the engineer's credentials; hence, a Bridge Party was organized. Comprising Roebling and his son, as well as their fellow bridge engineers, generals, businessmen, and high society figures, the party toured the country to review four bridges Roebling had built before the civil war. The final item on their itinerary was Roebling's Niagara Suspension Bridge. At the dinner to commemorate the end of the bridge tour, civil war veteran General Henry Warner Slocum gave a toast and called the Suspension Bridge a symbol of inspiration for the United States in its rebuilding efforts. This sentiment was shared by the guests and was expressed at later dinners across the United States. The achievement of building a large suspension bridge over a gorge in the face of overwhelming adversity—constant put-downs by the professional community, American and European—gave the United States a sense of pride. Nationalism rose as the country lauded the bridge. The completion of the bridge that had been deemed impossible by the Western world gave Americans, who had lesser technical accomplishments than Europe at that time, a trophy that stood above any other. The Suspension Bridge became the American symbol to brave the toughest of challenges and do the impossible, pushing their drive for industrialization even harder. Charles W. Woodman specifically drew attention to the Suspension Bridge in his 1865 address to the United States Senate for approval to build a rail system to transport a ship out of the water and up around the Niagara Falls.

Maintenance and replacement 

Budget concerns forced Roebling to build the Suspension Bridge primarily with wood; the cost of casting the components out of iron and transporting them "[way] out West" was exorbitant. The organic material decayed and rotted because of the moisture present around Niagara Falls. As the industrialization of the United States moved forward rapidly, the introduction of the Bessemer process greatly lowered the cost of the more durable steel and iron. By 1880, the Suspension Bridge's wooden trusses, beams, and flooring were replaced with steel. The wire cables were not replaced; their cores were still in pristine condition. The outer layer of wires in the cables was, however, lightly corroded and had to be replaced. Due to severe deterioration, the limestone towers were replaced in 1886 with steel framed versions. These renovations increased the bridge's strength and helped it handle heavier loads for a few more years.

The weight of trains in North America had greatly increased by the mid-1890s. Larger and more powerful locomotives were required to pull cars that handled an increasing number of passengers and goods; compared to the  locomotives crossing the bridge in the 1850s,  locomotives were the common engines 40 years later. The weight of these trains exceeded the specifications of the Suspension Bridge, and the bridge companies took the opportunity to review and request the replacement of the bridge. Civil engineer Leffert L. Buck, who had been hired to maintain the Suspension Bridge, was selected to design the replacement bridge. He settled for a bridge of the arch design. At that time, arch bridges were the new models for railway bridges and were more cost-efficient than suspension bridges. Buck built the new bridge around and below the Suspension Bridge, replacing it a piece at a time. His plan allowed bridge traffic—train and pedestrian—to continue without disruption. By August 27, 1897, the last pieces of the Suspension Bridge were dismantled, leaving the Lower Steel Arch Bridge—later renamed the Whirlpool Rapids Bridge—in its stead. On inspection, the cores of the cables that formerly held up the Suspension Bridge were found to be as sound as on the day the bridge was built.

Notes and references

Notes

References

Bibliography 
Primary sources

 
 
 
 

Secondary sources

External links 

 Bridges Over Niagara Falls at Niagara Falls Thunder Alley
 

Bridges completed in 1848
Bridges completed in 1855
Bridges in Niagara Falls, New York
Bridges in Niagara Falls, Ontario
Bridges over the Niagara River
Great Western Railway (Ontario)
Grand Trunk Railway
New York Central Railroad bridges
Railroad bridges in New York (state)
Railway bridges in the Regional Municipality of Niagara
Road bridges in New York (state)
Road-rail bridges in the United States
Former toll bridges in Canada
Former toll bridges in New York (state)
Former railway bridges in Canada
Former railway bridges in the United States
Steel bridges in the United States
Suspension bridges in Canada
Suspension bridges in New York (state)